Robin Stewart (9 October 1946 – 22 November 2015) was an English actor, game show host and reporter who was best known for playing Mike Abbott, the son of Sid James' character Sid Abbott in the 1970s sitcom Bless This House.

Early life 
Stewart was born in Calcutta, India to a Czechoslovakian father and English mother.

Career 
Stewart acted on television and in feature films in both the UK and Australia. Some of his British film roles include Tamahine, The Haunted House of Horror, Cromwell, Adventures of a Private Eye, and The Legend of the 7 Golden Vampires as Leyland Van Helsing.

He played the role of Mike Abbott in sit-com series Bless This House during its entire 1971–76 run; due to prior commitments he did not feature in the film version of the series. After being asked to go to New Zealand for a telethon and subsequently taken back to host his own show, Stewart ended up being asked to relocate where he became involved with such soaps as The Young Doctors as a villainous character trying to silence a blind patient who had overheard his criminal acts, and Sons and Daughters as the villainous doctor Ross Newman.

Other roles in Australia included a lead role in sex comedy feature film Pacific Banana (1981), and an appearance in prison based soap opera Punishment. He was also one of the main characters in The Timeless Land, playing the role of John MacArthur. He played one of the supporting roles in the rock series Sweet and Sour for ABC; co-hosted Good Morning Sydney with Maureen Duval. Briefly he was the advertising executive for Rolling Stone magazine. He briefly co-produced weekly magazine program Midweek Live for DDQ TV in Toowoomba with presenter Craig Berkman in early 1990. For 18 months Stewart was the senior producer for FNQTV in Cairns.

Personal life 
After two previous marriages, the second to magazine fashion editor Fiona Partridge, he married former partner Roberta "Bertie" Daler in 2012; they had one daughter. Stewart suffered a stroke in 2003, and after years of smoking 60 cigarettes a day also developed emphysema.

His death on 22 November 2015 was announced by his official website. He was 69 years old.

Filmography

Film

Television

References

External links

Robin Stewart (Aveleyman)

1946 births
2015 deaths
Male actors from Kolkata
English game show hosts
English male television actors
English male film actors
British male comedy actors